Edward Nash (1778–1821) was an English painter, best known for his miniatures.

Life 
Edward Nash was born in 1778. He became a pupil of Samuel Shelley, and trained as a miniaturist. He visited the Netherlands with Robert Southey and his family in 1815. Nash painted a miniature of the famous poet, and a double portrait miniature of Edith May Southey and Sara Coleridge, in 1820. In later life, he also spent several years in India. He exhibited at the Royal Academy of Arts in London from 1811 to 1820. He died in 1821, in London.

Gallery

References

Sources 

 Beyer, Andreas; Savoy, Bénédicte; Tegethoff, Wolf, eds. (2021). "Nash, Edward (1778)". Allgemeines Künstlerlexikon – International Artist Database – Online. Berlin, New York: K.G. Saur. Retrieved 15 September 2022 – via De Gruyter.
 Oliver, Valerie Cassel, ed. (2011). "Naish, Edward". Benezit Dictionary of Artists. Oxford University Press. Retrieved 15 September 2022 – via Oxford Art Online.
 Youngquist, Paul; Wang, Orrin N. C., eds. (2019). "Nash, Edward (1778–1821)". Romantic Circles. University of Colorado Boulder. Retrieved 15 September 2022.

1778 births
1821 deaths
19th-century English painters